Orllé is one of ten parishes (administrative divisions) in Caso, a municipality within the province and autonomous community of Asturias, in northern Spain.

The postal code is 33990.

References

External links
 Official website 

Parishes in Caso